This is a list of player transfers involving Premiership Rugby teams before or during the 2019–20 season. The list is of deals that are confirmed and are either from or to a rugby union team in the Premiership during the 2018–19 season. It is not unknown for confirmed deals to be cancelled at a later date. On 19 April 2019, London Irish are promoted to the Premiership Rugby whilst Newcastle Falcons are relegated to the RFU Championship for the 2019–20 season.

Bath

Players in
 Lewis Boyce from  Harlequins
 Christian Judge from  Cornish Pirates
 Will Stuart from  Wasps
 Mike Williams from  Leicester Tigers
 Josh McNally from  London Irish
 Miles Reid promoted from Academy
 Will Vaughan promoted from Academy
 Sam Nixon promoted from Academy
 Ollie Fox from  Yorkshire Carnegie
 Tom de Glanville promoted from Academy
 Josh Matavesi from  Newcastle Falcons
 Cameron Redpath from  Sale Sharks
 Rhys Webb from  Toulon

Players out
 Dave Attwood to  Bristol Bears
 Paul Grant to  Ealing Trailfinders
 Luke Charteris retired
 James Wilson to  Mitsubishi DynaBoars
 Victor Delmas to  Biarritz
 Kahn Fotuali'i to  Montpellier
 Jacques van Rooyen to  NTT DoCoMo Red Hurricanes
 Jack Wilson to  Hong Kong FC
 Cooper Vuna to  Newcastle Falcons
 Anthony Perenise to  Rouen
 Michael van Vuuren to  Northampton Saints
 Max Lahiff to  Bristol Bears
 Jamie Roberts to  Stormers

Bristol Bears

Players in
 Nathan Hughes from  Wasps
 Dave Attwood from  Bath
 Sam Bedlow promoted from Academy
 John Hawkins promoted from Academy
 Toby Fricker from  Ebbw Vale
 Jordan Lay returned from  Ospreys
 Nicky Thomas from  Scarlets
 Tyrese Johnson-Fisher from  Coastal Carolina Chanticleers
 Max Lahiff from  Bath
 Henry Purdy from  Coventry
 Adrian Choat from  Auckland (short-term loan)
 Bryan Byrne from  Leinster (short-term loan)
 Kieron Assiratti from  Cardiff Blues (short-term loan)
 Niyi Adeolokun from  Connacht
 Peter McCabe from  Connacht

Players out
 Nick Haining to  Edinburgh
 Jack Tovey to  Ealing Trailfinders
 Reiss Cullen to  Doncaster Knights
 George Smith retired
 Nick Fenton-Wells retired
 Joe Latta to  Suntory Sungoliath/ Otago
 Tusi Pisi to  Toyota Industries Shuttles
 Ehize Ehizode to  Chinnor
 Sione Faletau to  Yorkshire Carnegie
 Tom Pincus to  Melbourne Rebels
 Jack Lam released
 Tyrese Johnson-Fisher released
 Sam Jeffries Sabbatical

Exeter Chiefs

Players in
 Stuart Hogg from  Glasgow Warriors
 Will Witty from  Newcastle Falcons
 Tom Price from  Scarlets
 Jordon Poole from  Darlington Mowden Park
 Stan South from  Harlequins
 Jannes Kirsten from  Bulls
 Jacques Vermeulen from  Sharks
 Enrique Pieretto from  Jaguares

Players out
 Santiago Cordero to  Bordeaux
 Jack Owlett to  Wasps
 Wilhelm van der Sluys to  Lions
 Tom Lawday to  Harlequins
 Paul Davis to  Ealing Trailfinders
 Harry Strong to  Nottingham
 Toby Salmon to  Newcastle Falcons
 Moray Low retired
 Ollie Atkins to  Rouen
 Mitch Lees to  Brive
 James Freeman to  Rosslyn Park
 Onehunga Havili to  Sunwolves
 Stan South to  Edinburgh "short-term loan"

Gloucester

Players in
 Alex Seville promoted from Academy
 Joe Simpson from  Wasps
 Charlie Chapman promoted from Academy
 Alex Craig promoted from Academy
 Ciaran Knight promoted from Academy
 Tom Seabrook promoted from Academy
 Henry Walker promoted from Academy
 Jamal Ford-Robinson from  Northampton Saints
 Simon Linsell from  Hartpury College
 Chris Harris from  Newcastle Falcons
 Corné Fourie from  Stormers
 Jack Stanley from  Edinburgh
 Logovi'i Mulipola from  Newcastle Falcons (short-term deal)

Players out
 Paddy McAllister to  Connacht
 Ben Vellacott to  Wasps
 Tom Savage to  Suntory Sungoliath
 Gareth Denman to  Coventry
 Gareth Evans to  Ospreys
 Ewan Fenley to  Ealing Trailfinders
 Cameron Terry to  Ealing Trailfinders
 Joe Mullis to  Cinderford
 Henry Purdy to  Coventry
 Will Safe to  Hartpury College
 Kyle Traynor to  Rosslyn Park
 Callum Allen to  Nottingham
 Jaco Kriel to  Lions

Harlequins

Players in
 Santiago Garcia Botta from  Jaguares
 Martin Landajo from  Jagaures
 Michele Campagnaro from  Wasps
 Scott Baldwin from  Ospreys
 Stephan Lewies from  Lions
 Glen Young from  Newcastle Falcons
 Will Evans from  Leicester Tigers
 Simon Kerrod from  Worcester Warriors
 Tom Lawday from  Exeter Chiefs
 Toby Freeman from  Cornish Pirates
 Brett Herron from  Jersey Reds
 Luke Northmore from  Cardiff Metropolitan University
 Travis Ismaiel from  Bulls
 Vereniki Goneva from  Newcastle Falcons
 Tevita Cavubati from  Newcastle Falcons
 Tom Penny from  Newcastle Falcons
 Chris Ashton from  Sale Sharks
 Joe Gray from  Saracens (short-term loan)
 Marc Thomas from  Doncaster Knights
 Jack Stafford from  Munster

Players out
 Alofa Alofa to  Bayonne
 George Merrick to  Clermont
 Lewis Boyce to  Bath
 James Horwill retired
 Josh Ibuanokpe to  Saracens
 Tim Visser retired
 Charlie Walker to  Zebre
 Calum Waters to  England Sevens
 Demetri Catrakilis to  Southern Kings
 Mat Luamanu to  Bayonne
 Luke Wallace to  Coventry
 Stan South to  Exeter Chiefs
 Dave Ward to  Ampthill
 Josh McNulty to  Chinnor
 Henry Cheeseman to  Rosslyn Park
 Dave Lewis to  Rosslyn Park
 Ben Glynn to  Ospreys
 Charlie Mulchrone retired

Leicester Tigers

Players in
 Jordan Taufua from  Crusaders
 Noel Reid from  Leinster
 Calum Green from  Newcastle Falcons
 Jaco Taute from  Munster
 Tomás Lavanini from  Jaguares
 Nephi Leatigaga from  Biarritz
 Charlie Clare from  Bedford Blues
 Joe Thomas from  Otorohanga
 Johnny McPhillips from  Ulster
 EW Viljoen from  Stormers
 Hanro Liebenberg from  Bulls
 Jordan Coghlan from  Nottingham
 Tom Hardwick promoted from Academy
 Joe Heyes promoted from Academy
 Sam Lewis promoted from Academy
 Jordan Olowofela promoted from Academy
 Tommy Reffell promoted from Academy
 Sam Aspland-Robinson promoted from Academy
 Harry Simmons promoted from Academy
 Ben White promoted from Academy
 Andy Forsyth from  Coventry (short-term loan)
 Ifereimi Boladau from  Nottingham (short-term loan)
 David Williams from  Nottingham  (short-term loan)

Players out
 Matt To'omua to  Melbourne Rebels
 Mike Williams to  Bath
 Graham Kitchener to  Worcester Warriors
 Mathew Tait retired
 Will Evans to  Harlequins
 Tom Varndell to  South China Tigers
 James Voss to  Coventry
 Matt Smith retired
 Gareth Owen to  Newcastle Falcons
 Michael Fitzgerald to  Kamaishi Seawaves
 Clayton Blommetjies returned to  Scarlets
 Brendon O'Connor to  Hawke's Bay
 Valentino Mapapalangi to  Rouen
 Harry Mahoney to  Birmingham Moseley
 Fred Tuilagi to  Colorno
 Leonardo Sarto to  Benetton
 Joe Ford to  Yorkshire Carnegie
 David Feao to  Brisbane City
 David Denton retired
 Ross McMillan to  London Irish (short-term deal)
 Campese Ma'afu released
 Charlie Thacker released

London Irish

Players in
 Allan Dell from  Edinburgh
 Nick Phipps from  NSW Waratahs
 Curtis Rona from  NSW Waratahs
 Seán O'Brien from  Leinster
 Sekope Kepu from  NSW Waratahs
 Paddy Jackson from  Perpignan
 Waisake Naholo from  Highlanders
 Adam Coleman from  Melbourne Rebels
 Will Goodrick-Clarke from  Richmond
 Ruan Botha from  Sharks
 Steve Mafi from  Castres
 George Nott from  Sale Sharks
 Ross McMillan from  Leicester Tigers (short-term deal)
 Belgium Tuatagaloa from unattached
 James Stokes from  Coventry
 Ross Neal from  Seattle Seawolves (short-term deal)
 Sebastian de Chaves from  Newcastle Falcons (short-term deal)
 Dan Norton from  England sevens (short-term deal)

Players out
 Josh McNally to  Bath
 Ian Keatley to  Benetton
 Brendan McKibbin retired
 Mike Coman retired
 Tommy Bell to  Ealing Trailfinders
 Topsy Ojo retired
 Fergus Mulchrone to  Sale FC
 Luke McLean retired
 Sebastian de Chaves to  Newcastle Falcons
 Ofisa Treviranus to  Chinnor
 Greig Tonks retired
 Napolioni Nalaga to  Lokomotiv Penza
 Sam Twomey to  Rosslyn Park
 Ciaran Hearn to  Newfoundland Rock
 Jake Schatz to  Sunwolves
 Filo Paulo to  Cardiff Blues
 Manasa Saulo released

Northampton Saints

Players in
 Ehren Painter promoted from Academy
 Fraser Dingwall promoted from Academy
 James Grayson promoted from Academy
 Alex Mitchell promoted from Academy
 Matt Proctor from  Hurricanes
 Reuban Bird-Tulloch from  Saracens 
 Alex Moon promoted from Academy
 Owen Franks from  Crusaders
 Ryan Olowofela from  England Sevens
 Lewis Bean from  Birmingham Moseley
 Karl Garside from  Ampthill
 Henry Taylor from  Saracens
 Michael van Vuuren from  Bath
 James Mitchell from  Connacht (short-term deal)
 Sam Matavesi from  Cornish Pirates
 Gordon Reid from  Glasgow Warriors (short-term deal)
 Ben Glynn from  Ospreys (short-term deal)

Players out
 Luther Burrell to  Warrington Wolves
 Matt Worley to  Bedford Blues
 Jamal Ford-Robinson to  Gloucester
 James Craig retired
 James Haskell retired
 Charlie Davies retired
 Andrew Kellaway to  Counties Manukau
 Tom Emery to  Henley Hawks
 Heinrich Brüssow retired
 Will Davis to  Ealing Trailfinders (season long loan)
 Dylan Hartley retired
 Nafi Tuitavake to  Bulls
 Dominic Barrow released
 Ken Pisi released

Sale Sharks

Players in
 Jake Cooper-Woolley from  Wasps
 Robert du Preez from  Sharks
 Akker van der Merwe from  Sharks
 Lood de Jager from  Bulls
 Coenie Oosthuizen from  Sharks
 Dan du Preez from  Sharks
 Jean-Luc du Preez from  Sharks
 Simon Hammersley from  Newcastle Falcons
 Mark Wilson from  Newcastle Falcons (season-long loan)
 Embrose Papier from  Bulls (short-term loan)
 Ben Carlile from  Yorkshire Carnegie
 Joe Carpenter from  Yorkshire Carnegie

Players out
 Andrei Ostrikov to  Grenoble
 Mark Jennings sabbatical
 Alexandru Țăruș to  Zebre
 Johnny Leota to  Sale FC
 Paolo Odogwu to  Wasps
 James O'Connor to  Queensland Reds
 Josh Strauss to  Bulls
 James Flynn to  Yorkshire Carnegie
 George Nott to  London Irish
 Ewan Ashman to  Edinburgh (short-term loan)
 Tom Bristow released
 Cameron Redpath to  Bath
 Sam Moore to  Cardiff Blues
 Chris Ashton to  Harlequins

Saracens

Players in
 Elliot Daly from  Wasps
 Rhys Carré from  Cardiff Blues
 Jack Singleton from  Worcester Warriors
 Alex Day from  Cornish Pirates
 Josh Ibuanokpe from  Harlequins
 Sam Wainwright from  RGC 1404
 Damian Willemse from  Stormers (short-term loan)
 Alistair Crossdale promoted from Academy
 Dom Morris promoted from Academy
 Eroni Mawi from  Fijian Latui (short-term deal)

Players out
 Christopher Tolofua to  Toulon
 Reuban Bird-Tulloch to  Northampton Saints
 Sione Vailanu to  Wasps
 Hayden Thompson-Stringer to  Brive
 David Strettle retired
 Henry Taylor to  Northampton Saints
 Billy Walker to  Nottingham
 Oli Morris to  Worcester Warriors
 Tom Griffiths to  Dragons
 Alfie Scopes to  Loughborough Students
 Alex Gliksten to  Bedford Blues
 Dominic Day to  San Diego Legion
 Marcelo Bosch to  Burton
 Schalk Burger released
 Tadgh McElroy released
 Liam Williams to  Scarlets
 Joe Gray to  Harlequins (short-term loan)

Wasps

Players in
 Malakai Fekitoa from  Toulon
 Jeffery Toomaga-Allen from  Hurricanes
 Jack Owlett from  Exeter Chiefs
 Ben Vellacott from  Gloucester
 Matteo Minozzi from  Zebre
 Sione Vailanu from  Saracens
 Biyi Alo from  Coventry
 Will Porter promoted from Academy
 Callum Sirker promoted from Academy
 Sam Spink promoted from Academy
 Tom Willis promoted from Academy
 Tim Cardall promoted from Academy
 Gabriel Oghre promoted from Academy
 Owain James promoted from Academy
 Theo Vukasinovic from  London Scottish
 Paolo Odogwu from  Sale Sharks
 Zach Kibirige from  Newcastle Falcons
 Sam Wolstenholme from  Yorkshire Carnegie
 Jacob Umaga promoted from Academy

Players out
 Jake Cooper-Woolley to  Sale Sharks
 Ambrose Curtis to  Vannes
 Nathan Hughes to  Bristol Bears
 Will Stuart to  Bath
 Elliot Daly to  Saracens
 Joe Simpson to  Gloucester
 Willie le Roux to  Toyota Verblitz
 Joe Atkinson to  Bedford Blues
 Michele Campagnaro to  Harlequins
 Antonio Harris to  Jersey Reds
 George Thornton to  Glasgow Warriors
 Craig Hampson to  Ealing Trailfinders
 Kearnan Myall to  Oxford University
 David Langley to  Coventry
 Gabiriele Lovobalavu to  Oyonnax
 Marcus Garratt retired
 Ross Neal to  Seattle Seawolves
 Matt Mullan released
 Owain James released
 Alex Rieder retired

Worcester Warriors

Players in
 Ted Hill promoted from Academy
 Graham Kitchener from  Leicester Tigers
 Conor Carey from  Connacht
 Jono Kitto from  Northland
 Melani Nanai from  Blues
 Ed Fidow from  Provence
 Caleb Montgomery from  Ulster
 Matt Moulds from  Blues
 Richard Palframan from  London Scottish
 Andrew Kitchener promoted from Academy
 Oli Morris from  Saracens

Players out
 Pierce Phillips to  Agen
 Gareth Milasinovich to  Ulster
 Bryce Heem to  Toulon
 Josh Adams to  Cardiff Blues
 Simon Kerrod to  Harlequins
 Darren Barry to  Newcastle Falcons
 Wynand Olivier retired
 Dewald Potgieter retired
 Jack Singleton to  Saracens
 Jonny Arr to  Birmingham Moseley
 Mason Tonks to  Birmingham Moseley
 Jack Cosgrove to  Dragons
 Carl Kirwan to  Chinnor
 Luke Baldwin to  Dragons (season long loan)
 Zac Xiourouppa to  Birmingham Moseley
 Nick Rigby to  Birmingham & Solihull
 Ben Te'o to  Toulon (short-term deal)
 Alafoti Fa'osiliva to  Bedford Blues

See also
List of 2019–20 Pro14 transfers
List of 2019–20 RFU Championship transfers
List of 2019–20 Super Rugby transfers
List of 2019–20 Top 14 transfers
List of 2019–20 Major League Rugby transfers

References

2019-20
transfers